Robert Cochran (also credited as Bob Cochran) is the co-creator of the television series 24. Before that, he and Joel Surnow written and produced for the television series The Commish. Cochran had also written for shows such as L.A. Law, Falcon Crest and JAG. Cochran and Surnow later created and produced the television series La Femme Nikita and later also served as the series consultants. His production company is Real Time Productions.

In 2007, he created the TV show pilots, Company Man with David Ehrman and also The Call with David Hemingson, both of which went unsold.  In 2014 he returned to write for 24: Live Another Day. In 2016, he wrote on the spin-off series 24: Legacy.

In 2019, Cochran published a young adult fantasy novel, The Sword and the Dagger.

References

External links
 

American television producers
Living people
Stanford Law School alumni
Primetime Emmy Award winners
Showrunners
American male screenwriters
American television writers
American male television writers
Year of birth missing (living people)